The Mann brothers refers to the German writers Heinrich Mann (1871–1950) and Thomas Mann (1875–1955). Both went to the United States after Adolf Hitler and the Nazi Party came to power in Germany. A third brother, Viktor, did not have a high public profile.

See also
Mann family

References

German male writers